The Great Northern Derby is a harness racing event for 3 year old standardbreds. It is a major event for 3 year old colts and geldings in New Zealand. It is run at Alexandra Park in Auckland, on the same night as the Auckland Cup in early March. The stake of $400,000 is the richest for 3-year-olds in Australasia.

Records

Most wins by an owner:
 4 - R A McKenzie (1963, 1968, 1971, 1984)

Winners list

Other major races
 Auckland Trotting Cup
 New Zealand Trotting Cup
 New Zealand Free For All
 New Zealand Trotting Derby
 Noel J Taylor Mile
 New Zealand Messenger
 Rowe Cup
 Dominion Handicap
 Inter Dominion Pacing Championship
 Inter Dominion Trotting Championship

See also
 Harness racing
 Harness racing in New Zealand

References

Horse races in New Zealand